La Peseta is a station on Line 11 of the Madrid Metro. It is located in fare Zone A.

References 

Line 11 (Madrid Metro) stations
Railway stations in Spain opened in 2006